Woon Wing Yip OBE (born December 1937) is a Hong Kong-born British entrepreneur, best known for having started the Wing Yip supermarket chain.

Early life
A Hakka born in December 1937, in British Hong Kong. Yip arrived in Hull, England from Hong Kong in 1959 with £2. He then worked and later started his own restaurants in the East Anglia region of England, in towns such as Clacton and Ipswich.

Wing-Yip
Yip had the ability to speak English and he knew that food wholesale business is more profitable than running a Chinese takeaway. Therefore, in 1969, he founded the Wing Yip supermarket in Birmingham. The Wing Yip business has since branched out into property development, management and investment, with more than 60 commercial and residential tenants around the country. The property portfolio is now worth around £23 million. With an annual turnover of £80 million, he became the first Anglo-Chinese tycoon in United Kingdom.

Other achievements
Yip is also a philanthropist who has among other acts of generosity, endowed several bursaries and scholarships for university students from both the UK and China, administered through the W Wing Yip and Brothers Charitable Trust. In 2008 Yip was awarded an Honorary Doctorate from Birmingham City University. He was appointed Officer of the Order of the British Empire (OBE) in the 2010 New Year Honours.

Footnotes

1937 births
Living people
British people of Chinese descent
Hong Kong people of Hakka descent
People from Dongguan
British businesspeople
Officers of the Order of the British Empire
Chinese emigrants to England
Naturalised citizens of the United Kingdom